Unik may refer to:

UNIK , Unik[Khanal] is a Nepalese people from Nepal.He is a Streamer
Unik FK, a Swedish association football club
Unik BK, a Swedish bandy club